Oshikawa (written: 押川) is a Japanese surname. Notable people with the surname include:

, Japanese Protestant missionary and educator
, Japanese politician
, Japanese baseball player
, Japanese writer, journalist and editor

Japanese-language surnames